The Malaria in the Land of Israel was a severe epidemic in the region of Palestine.
The epidemic killed many people from the bible period until it was finally eradicated in the early 1960s.
Malaria was originally a large obstacle to Zionist settlement, because it restricted the land that was usable for settlement, and affected the lifestyle of the Jewish settlers in Palestine.


Kligler's anti-malaria campaign
Israel Jacob Kligler was a microbiologist, a Zionist, and a key contributor to the eradication of malaria in Israel. Malaria was a major factor in morbidity and death in the country, and had important repercussions for Jewish settlement.  Before aliyah, Kligler gathered information about the health issues in the country and acquired experience in the field by joining a delegation for the Study of Yellow Fever in South America. Kligler prepared a malaria eradication program that was sent to several organizations and public figures, including Justice Louis Brandeis, who visited the country in 1919 and was shocked by the morbidity of malaria.  After failing to convince Chaim Weizmann and the Zionist executives of the need to invest in the eradication of malaria, Brandeis privately financed $10,000 for an experimental malaria elimination project. This project was directed by Kliger and run through Hadassah Medical Centre.
In the Galilee and around Lake Kinnereth (Sea of Galilee), malaria had decimated the Jewish settlements, with the incidence rate over 95 percent in 1919.  By 1921, Kligler reported that the incidence rate had been cut drastically, with many settlements having no cases at all.

Kligler showed the ineffectiveness of previous methods used for the control of malaria in the country, namely, planting of Eucalyptus trees to dry the marshes, and the provision of Quinine prophylaxis for preventing infection. Kligler focused his studies on the larval stage of the mosquito life-cycle.  He studied the prevalence of various Anopheles species, their biology and nesting grounds, tested different methods of eradication and selected the appropriate measures, taking into account their efficiency and cost.

His work demonstrated that drainage of the swamps alone would have had little effect on the malaria, because the mosquitoes breed in little pools of water, which even the most elaborate system of drainage would not have reached. It was subsequently pointed out that at least half of the malaria could be ascribed simply to human carelessness and neglect. This resulted in such an improvement to the quality of the land with respect to malaria and marshes that agriculture could be introduced safely.

One of the new method he initiated was the introduction of Gambusia fish to water sources in the country in 1923. The use of larvivorous fish to diminish mosquito populations was already well known at that time, e.g., the importance lies in the protocols used to define which of the known species of Gambusia was best suited to the local conditions. The fish effectively reduced the number of mosquito larva surviving into adulthood. The result, combined with drainage techniques, was the almost total eradication of malaria in the upper Jordan Valley, i.e. the Huleh area, north of the Sea of Galilee. (Figure 3)

The achievements of Kligler and his staff in combating malaria were brought to the attention of the Health Organization, an agency of the League of Nations, the predecessor of the World Health Organization, which in May 1925 sent a delegation to Mandatory Palestine. (Figure 4) The delegation gave international recognition to the importance of anti-malarial activity conducted in the country.
Kligler lectured on the war against malaria in Mandatory Palestine at the first international malaria conference held in Rome in October 1925; in the lecture he described the main effort is directed towards destruction of breeding places of mosquitoes.

In 1927, he founded the "Malaria Research Station" of the Hebrew University in Rosh Pina, where pioneering fieldwork was carried out relating to the eradication of malaria. Two years later, he appointed Dr. Gideon Mer as the station manager and together they published a series of articles on malaria.

References

External links 
 How the Fight Against Malaria Infected the Future Map of Israel
 Review: Epidemiology and Control of Malaria in Palestine
 The Epidemiology and Control of Malaria in Palestine
 Local Malaria Elimination: A Historical Perspective from Palestine 100 Years Ago Informs the Current Way Forward in Sub-Saharan Africa
JSTOR:
 Review: Epidemiology and Control of Malaria in Palestine
 Malaria in Rural Settlements in Palestine
 THE MALARIAL FEVERS OF PALESTINE AND THEIR PREVENTION
 Malaria and Rainfall Periodicity in Palestine

Palestine (region)
Malaria
Epidemics